William Hyland is the name of:

William F. Hyland (1923–2013), Attorney General of New Jersey, 1974–1978
William G. Hyland (1929–2008), deputy national security adviser to Gerald R. Ford and editor of Foreign Affairs
Willie Hyland (born 1989), Irish hurler